Rajarata [rā dja ra tə] (Meaning: King's country) (Sinhala: රජරට) (Tamil: ரஜரட) was one of three historical regions of the island of Sri Lanka for about 1,700 years from the 6th century BCE to the early 13th century CE. Several ancient cities, including Tambapanni, Upatissa Nuwara, Anuradhapura and Polonnaruwa, were established as capitals within the area by successive rulers. Rajarata was under the direct administration of the King (raja/king, rata/country). Two other areas, Malayarata and Ruhunurata, were ruled by the king's brothers "Mapa" and "Epa" . The Magha invasion in the 13th century brought about the end of the Rajarata kingdom.

History and kingdoms 
The first kingdom in Rajarata was established by Prince Vijaya in 543 BCE. He settled near the delta of the Malvathu River between Chilaw and Mannar. According o a local myth, Prince Vijaya married a local princess, Kuveni, to gain control of Rajarata. With her help, he betrayed and killed all of the regional leaders. After his death, the administrative center was moved to the countryside along the Malvathu Oya. The river was ideal for agriculture. The first three administrative centres Tambapanni, Upatissa Nuwara, and Anuradhapura, were situated close to the Malvathu Oya.
King Pandukabhaya, once a prince descended from local Yaksha and Sinha tribes, formed a stable kingdom in Anuradhapura. He garnered support from tribes in different areas of the island.

Administrative centres in Rajarata:
 Tambapanni - Prince Vijaya - Founded in 543 BCE
 Upatissa Nuwara - Founded by King Upatissa in 505 BCE
 Anuradhapura - Founded by King Pandukabhaya in 377 BCE
 Sigiriya - Built by King Kashyapa (477 – 495 CE), but after the death of the king center moved to Anuradhapura
 Polonnaruwa - Founded by King Vijayabahu I

Settlements 
Prince Vijaya and his clan settled in Tambapanni, near the Malvatu Oya delta. According to Mahavamsa, various groups came from India in the period between Prince Vijaya and King Pandukabhaya's reign, frequently settling along the Malvathu Oya. In 377 BCE, King Pandukabhaya moved the administrative centre to Anuradhapura. Most of the settlements were located near rivers and reservoirs. Water was used for agricultural purposes. According to the Yodha wewa area in Mannar District by King Dhatusena, Eropathana in Vavuniya District, Padawiya area in Anuradhapura District and Mullaitivu District
by King Moggallana II the extent of Sri Lanka's golden civilization spread to the southern boundary of the Vanni forest. The thick Vanni forest acted as a barrier to colonizers above the southern border of the forest. Tanks built during the Anuradhapura era (Giant's, Padaviya, Minneriya, Kantale, Mahavillachchiya, Thabbowa, Kala) are proof of the early settlements in Rajarata area.

Initial settlements based near rivers:

 Malvathu oya - Anuradhapura, Upatissa nuwara, Tambapanni
 Mahaweli river - Pollonnaruwa
 Deduru oya - Sigiriya, Yapahuwa

Boundaries

Boundaries of the three divisions (Rata):

 Raja rata - Area between Deduru oya and the Mahaweli river
 Ruhunu rata - Area between the Mahaweli river and Kalu gaga
 Malaya rata - Area between Deduru oya and Kalu gaga

Fall of Rajarata 
In 1215, Kalinga Magha invaded Rajarata with an army of 24,000 soldiers . After the conquest of Rajarata, Magha established his capital in Pollonnaruwa. Then the Kalinga forces extended their power to the Malaya Rata. During the rise of the Kingdom of Dambadeniya under the king Vijayabahu III (1220-1224 CE), Magha lost the control of Malaya Rata. The native Sinhalese resisted the Magha's administration at Pollonnaruwa. The Sinhalese gathered around inaccessible towns, fortresses and mountains including Yapahuwa and Gangadoni under army generals including Subha and Sankha. Because of the rising threat, Pandyan troops established an administration centre in Jaffna Peninsula which was more secure and isolated by the impenetrable Vanni forest. Later Rajarata was annexed by king Parakramabahu II(1236–70). His power extended over Rohana, the central hills, Rajarata and the Vanni. 

The Sinhalese tried to re-establish the administrative centre in Rajarata but this never happened because of constant battles with invaders from south India. The administration centre was moved away from Rajarata by the Sinhalese. The defeat of Pandyan in South India in the rising Mogul empires weakened the Tamil power in Sri Lanka. The last Pandyan ruler of Madurai, was defeated and expelled in 1323 by Malik Kafur, the army general of the Muslim empire Delhi Sultanate. The falling of Pandyan was a historical event that had a big impact for Sri Lanka.

It leads to following events:

 Military rulers "Aryacakravarti" - who was appointed as minister of Pandyan empire - made the Jaffna administrative center independent from Pandyans and established the Jaffna kingdom and Arya Chakrawarthi dynasty.
 The Tamil lost power in the Vanni and they withdrew from Vanni to the Jaffna Peninsula. The population was very low in this area until the British started the Tamil Colonization south to Parantan.
 Area below Vanni forest stabilized under Sinhala Kingdom

Also, ancient Rajarata (before the 13th century) was divided into three parts:

 Jaffna kingdom - Jaffna peninsula. This was ruled by the Arya Chakrawarthi dynasty.
 Rajarata - Area below the Vanni. This area was ruled by the Sinhalese kingdoms.
 Vanni Area  - Area which covers the Vanni forest, abandoned area between Sinhala Kingdom and Jaffna Kingdom

See also
Rajarata University of Sri Lanka

References

Anuradhapura period
History of North Central Province, Sri Lanka
Kingdom of Polonnaruwa